Trimmed in Scarlet is a 1923 American silent drama film directed by Jack Conway and produced and distributed by Universal Pictures. It is based on the 1920 Broadway play, Trimmed in Scarlet, by William Hurlbut and starring Broadway's Maxine Elliott. This play marked the last time Maxine Elliott appeared on Broadway. Her role in the film is played by veteran cinema star Kathlyn Williams. All prints of this film are believed lost.

Cast
Kathlyn Williams as Cordelia Ebbing / Madame de la Fleur
Roy Stewart as Revere Wayne
Lucille Ricksen as Faith Ebbing (credited as Lucille Rickson)
Robert Agnew as David Pierce
David Torrence as Charles Knight
Phillips Smalley as Peter Ebbing
Eve Southern as Fifi Barclay
Bert Sprotte as Duroc
Grace Carlyle as Molly Todd
Gerard Alexander as Ruth Kipp (credited as Gerard Grassby)
Raymond Hatton as Mr. Kipp
Philo McCullough as Count De Signeur

References

External links

1923 films
1923 drama films
Silent American drama films
American silent feature films
American black-and-white films
American films based on plays
Films directed by Jack Conway
Lost American films
Universal Pictures films
1923 lost films
Lost drama films
1920s American films